The Leniwka is the former name of the western branch of the Vistula (now Vistula) in northern Poland. It begins behind the lock in Biała Góra, where the Nogat, the eastern branch, also begins. The current Martwa Wisła is part of Leniwka.

Towns and villages on the Leniwka:
 Piekło
 Biała Góra
 Tczew
 Lisewo Malborskie
 Koźliny
 Ostaszewo
 Kiezmark
 Drewnica
 Gdańsk
 Gdańska Głowa
 Przegalina
 Świbno
 Mikoszewo

References

Rivers of Poland